Sequoia High School can refer to:
Sequoia High School (Redwood City, California)
Sequoia High School (Visalia, California)
Sequoia High School (Everett, Washington)

See also
 Sequoyah High School (disambiguation)